Blue Waters is an American supercomputer.

Blue waters or Bluewaters may also refer to:
 Blue waters, the global deep oceans
 Blue Waters, Christ Church, Barbados, a populated place in the parish of Christ Church, Barbados
 Blue Waters F.C., a Namibian football club
 Bluewaters Island, Dubai, UAE
 Battle of Blue Waters

See also
 Bluewater (disambiguation)